The Poem of the Right Angle (Le poème de l'angle droit) is a series of 19 paintings and corresponding writings composed by the influential Swiss-French architect Le Corbusier between 1947 and 1953 and first published in book format as a limited edition of 250 copies in 1955. Aside from his seminal manifesto Toward an Architecture, The Poem of the Right Angle is considered to be his most lucid synthesis of personal maxims.

Introduction
The Poem of the Right Angle was composed over a period of seven years, from 1947 to 1953. The paintings are arranged symmetrically in seven rows, or "zones" and read across, in order, 5, 3, 5, 1, 3, 1, 1 such that the entire composition appears top-heavy and cross-like. Corbusier referred to this organization as an iconostase, or iconostasis.  Each zone, lettered A-G, is assigned a title and corresponding color. Le Corbusier was very interested in classic themes of alchemy, and each piece, as well as the significance of its placement in the color-coded sets,  draws from and illuminates the dialectic of opposites inherent in alchemical processes.

A. Milieu (Environment-Green)
Green is the alchemical symbol of the primal matter of the universe. Le Corbusier uses this zone as a taxonomy of natural cycles.

A.1. Representative of the cyclical nature of the sun
...the two rhythmswhich regulate our destiny:A sun risesA sun setsA sun rises againA.2. Representative of the water cycle, an important part of alchemy and "a matrix for a dualistic universal confrontation."
       The level establishes where
       stops the descent of the waters
       to the sea
       the sea daughter of droplets
       and mother of vapors. And
       the horizontal defines
       the liquid content.

A.3. Introduces earth symbol, cardinal symbols, and man as procreator. It also is the first passage that directly references the right angle, here as a symbol of life, living and "uprightness".
       Upright on the terrestrial plateau
       of things perceptible to you
       contract with nature a pact of solidarity: it is the right angle
               Upright in front of the sea vertical
       there you are on your legs.

A.4. Uses figure-ground and heavy contrast to remark on the role of chaos in the divide between the conscious and unconscious
       The law of the meander is
       active in the thoughts and
       enterprises of men forming their
       ever renewing avatars
              But the trajectory gushes out
       from the mind and is projected by
       the clairvoyants beyond
       confusion

A.5. Very similar to the actual cover of the work, it is split down the middle and the clasped hands signal contradiction and reconciliation of opposites, which Corbusier stated were the only ways to ensure human survival. In a similar painting, the clasped hands symbolize the architect and the engineer working together.
       I have thoughts that two hands
       and their interlocking fingers
       express this right and
       this left unrelentingly
       unified and so necessary
       to reconciliation.
              The only possibility of survival
       offered to life

B. Esprit (Spirit-Blue)
This zone represents the links between nature, architecture and the cosmos.

B.2. "Le Modulor" - Corbusier's Modular Man, an iconic illustration of proportion, is juxtaposed with a shell, which Corbusier regarded as an archetypal female form. The shell form also embodies the same proportional values as the Modulor, based on the Golden section.
       Its value is in
       this: the human body
       chosen as admissible
       support of numbers...
       .....Here is proportion!

B.3. This is an overly architectural frame. Floorplates and a foundation are clearly depicted, and an owl, a classic symbol of wisdom, is clearly visible in the foundation.
       Cleared of obstacles better
       that before the house of
       men mistress of his form
       takes up her abode in nature
              Complete in herself
       making her case on all grounds
       open to the four horizons

B.4. Another architectural frame which illuminates the concept of the brise soleil through the sun above and the "secret world" below.
       The clock and the solar
       calendar brought to
       architecture the "brise-soleil"
       installed in front of the windows of
       modern buildings

C. Chair (Flesh-Violet)
Corbusier's tribute to the flesh consists of more complicated figures representing the animal world and all of its creative capacities.

C.1.
       Some oxen of burden pass
       every day in front of my window.
       Because of being designed and redesigned
       the ox - of pebble and of root
       becomes bull.

C.2.
       They are innumerable who
       sleep but others know
       to open the eye.
              Because the profound refuge is
       in the great cavern of
       sleep that other side of
       life in the night.

C.3. This is the centerpiece of the iconostase, which Corbusier dedicated to his wife.
       Tenderness!
       Shell the Sea has not ceased
       to throw us the wreckage of
       smiling harmony on the shores.
              Hand kneads hand caresses
       hand glides. The hand and the
       sea love one another.

C.4. The center line is quite overt, which may indicate that the image can also be recognized when turned 90°, a practice Le Corbusier was fond of.
       They are but
       half, giving to
       life only one half
              And the second part comes
       to them and fuses
       And good or bad comes to them
       the two
              who met!

C.5. The image of a woman's body with a unicorn's head is a motif that is also seen in the mural of Le Corbusier's Swiss Pavilion'' at the Paris University Campus (C.I.U.P.), as are 3 other plates from the Poeme.
       The galley sails
       The voices singing on board
       As all becomes strange
       and is transposed
       is transported high
       and is reflected on
       the plan of happiness

D. Fusion (Red)
D.3.
       Do not overwhelm then he
       who wants to take his part of the
       risks of life - Let
       the metals fuse
       tolerate the alchemists who
       besides leave you outside
       the cause

E. Caractère (Character-Clear)
The ascription of the "clear" color frames this zone, which represents light and will reborn in man.

E.2. The complex image of many women and a horse is achieved through phenomenal transparency and separation of color from line.
       The amazons are ready
       to leave to go to come back and
              to leave again and
       to fight combat always
       soldier.
       The amazons are young
       they do not grow old.

E.3. This is the most reproduced image from the series. The motif of the clasped hands seen in A.5. is repeated, along with a crescent face, indicative of the moon.
       Categorical
       right angle of the character
       of the spirit of the heart.
       I mirrored myself in this character
         and found myself
           found at home
             found
       Horizontal vision in front.

E.4. This image recalls some of Le Corbusier's paintings from the 1930s. It is orthogonal, architectural and labyrinthine.
       Will appear I sense it
       the splendor of brut concrete
       and the grandeur which it will
       have had to think the marriage
       of lines
              to weight the forms
              To weight...

F. Offre (Offering-Yellow)
F.3. The symbol of the open hand appears as an "offering", and the interior lines and contours reveal traits and hidden characteristics.
       It is open since
       all is present available
       seizable
       Open to receive
       Open also in order that each
       comes there to take

G. Outil (Tool-Purple)
G.3. The presentation of a "tool" is an analogy to the Philosopher's stone, both the solution and the question, thus establishing the cyclical nature of the work.
       one has
       with a piece of coal
       traced the right angle
              the sign
       It is the response and the guide
              the fact
              a response
              a choice

Notes

External links

Fondation Le Corbusier page on the poem
(Archived website) Images associated with the poems

1953 paintings
1953 essays